Augusta High School is a comprehensive public high school in Augusta, Arkansas, United States serving approximately 200 students in grades 6 through 12. The school is one of two public high schools in Woodruff County, Arkansas; the other is McCrory High School and it is the only high school in the Augusta School District.

Academics 
The assumed course of study follows the Smart Core curriculum developed by the Arkansas Department of Education (ADE), which requires students to complete at least 22 units to graduate. Students complete regular (core and career focus) courses and exams and may select Advanced Placement coursework and exams that provide an opportunity for college credit. The school is accredited by the ADE.

Athletics 
The Augusta High School mascot and athletic emblem is the Red Devil with Red and white serving as its school colors.

For 2014-16, the Augusta Red Devils compete in the 2A Region 6 (Football) Conference under the administration of the Arkansas Activities Association (AAA). Interscholastic activities include baseball, cheer, cross country (boys/girls), football, golf (boys/girls), softball, and track (boys/girls).

 Football: The Red Devils football teams have captured three state football championships winning consecutive titles in 1982 and 1983 before adding its last title banner in 1992.
 Golf: The boys golf team won its only state golf championship in 1971.
 Track and field: The girls track team won its only state championship in 1982.  The boys track teams have won three state track and field championship titles (1988, 2010, 2011).

Notable alumni 
 Billy Ray Smith Sr. (1953)—NFL player (1957–71); member of 1971 Super Bowl champion Baltimore Colts

References

External links 
 

Public high schools in Arkansas
Schools in Woodruff County, Arkansas
Augusta, Arkansas